Aegaeon , or  (provisional designation ), is a natural satellite of Saturn. It is thought to be similarly smooth as Methone. It orbits between Janus and Mimas within Saturn's G Ring.

Discovery and naming 

Images of Aegaeon were taken by Cassini on 15 August 2008, and its discovery was announced on 3 March 2009 by Carolyn Porco of the Cassini Imaging Science Team using the provisional designation .

Aegaeon was named after one of the hekatonkheires on 5 May 2009.

Orbit 

Aegaeon orbits within the bright segment of Saturn's G Ring, and is probably a major source of the ring. Debris knocked off Aegaeon forms a bright arc near the inner edge, which in turn spreads to form the rest of the ring. Aegaeon orbits in a 7:6 corotation eccentricity resonance with Mimas, which causes an approximately 4-year oscillation of about 4 km in its semi-major axis, and a corresponding oscillation of a few degrees in its mean longitude. It orbits Saturn at an average distance of 167,500 km in 0.80812 days, at an inclination of 0.001° to Saturn's equator, with an eccentricity of 0.0002.

Physical characteristics 

Measurements of its mass, based on its interaction with the dust particles that make up the G ring arc the moon is embedded in, suggest a density similar to that of water ice. Aegaeon has the lowest albedo, below 0.15, of any Saturnian moon inward of Titan. This might be due to either darker meteoric material making up the dust in the G ring or due to Aegaeon having been disrupted, stripping away its ice-rich surface and leaving the rocky inner core behind.

Exploration 

The Cassini spacecraft has performed four flybys of Aegaeon closer than 20,000 km, though only one has occurred since it was discovered in 2008. The closest of these pre-discovery encounters took place on 5 September 2005 at a distance of 8,517 km.  An encounter on 27 January 2010 at a distance 13,306 km allowed Cassini to acquire its highest resolution images of Aegaeon. On 19 December 2015, Cassini was unable to acquire any images from a planned close flyby.

References 

Moons of Saturn
20090303
Moons with a prograde orbit